Samuel McClain (April 15, 1943 – June 15, 2015), billed as Mighty Sam McClain, was an American soul blues singer and songwriter.

Life and career
He was born in Monroe, Louisiana. As a five-year-old, he began singing in his mother's Gospel Church. McClain left home when he was thirteen and followed local R&B guitarist, Little Melvin Underwood through the Chitlin' Circuit, first as his valet and then as lead vocalist himself at 15.

While singing at the 506 Club in Pensacola, Florida he was introduced to the record producer and DJ, Papa Don Schroeder and in 1966, McClain recorded a cover version of Patsy Cline's "Sweet Dreams". Several recording sessions at Muscle Shoals produced the further singles, "Fannie-May" and "In the Same Old Way". For fifteen years, first in Nashville, Tennessee, then in New Orleans, McClain worked at menial jobs. McClain toured and recorded in Japan in 1989. The end product, Live in Japan, featured Wayne Bennett.

By the early 1990s, McClain relocated to New England through his participation in the "Hubert Sumlin Blues Party" project. This led to Joe Harley and AudioQuest Music and Manager, PETER LEMBO. The results were the successful releases, Give It Up To Love and Keep On Movin'''. After his move to New Hampshire, then followed Sledgehammer Soul and Down Home Blues. In 1998 McClain had two releases, Journey and Joy & Pain on the CrossCut Records label. Soul Survivor: The Best of Mighty Sam McClain was his farewell to AudioQuest in 1999. McClain signed on with the Telarc Blues in 1999, taking his longtime producer Joe Harley with him, and recorded the Blues Music Award nominated Blues for the Soul (2000) and Sweet Dreams (2001).

In 1996, McClain formed McClain Productions after successfully co-producing his albums with Joe Harley. He also created his own record label, Mighty Music, which released One More Bridge To Cross in February 2003. Betcha Didn't Know was issued in July 2009 on Mighty Music. It was nominated by the Blues Association as 'Soul/Blues Album 2010'.

In 2008, McClain joined the 'Give US Your Poor' project, benefiting the homeless. He also co-wrote with the saxophonist Scott Shetler, "Show Me the Way".  He continued to work with this project, performing at both the Lincoln Center for the Performing Arts in New York City, and at The Kennedy Center in Washington, D.C. and other venues, sharing the stage with Natalie Merchant, and Mario Frangoulis. In early 2009, McClain recorded an album of duets with the Iranian folk singer, Mahsa Vahdat. The resulting album, Scent of Reunion: Love Duets Across Civilizations reached #6 in the European World Music Chart.

McClain and the guitarist for this project, Knut Reiersrud, collaborated on One Drop is Plenty that was recorded in Norway in January 2011. Also, McClain sung the theme song for the film, Time and Charges. "Find the Sun" was written by Thompson and Joe Deleault, and McClain appeared in a cameo role in the film singing the song.

McClain recorded Too Much Jesus (Not Enough Whiskey) in 2012. The following year the title song, "Too Much Jesus (Not Enough Whiskey)," written by McClain and Pat Herlehy, was nominated for a Blues Music Award in the 'Best Song' category.

In 2014 McClain was featured on the compilation Songs from a Stolen Spring'' that paired Western musicians with artists from the Arab Spring.  On the album McClain performed "If I Can Dream" - a Walter Earl Brown song made famous by Elvis Presley.  The performance was meshed with "Bread, Freedom" by the Egyptian musician Ramy Essam who is best known for his appearances in Tahrir Square in Cairo during the Egyptian Revolution of 2011.

McClain lost a long battle with colon cancer and died on June 15, 2015.

Discography

References

External links
 Official Mighty Sam McClain Site
 An in-depth interview with Mighty Sam at Soul Express
 An interview with Mighty Sam at Soul Express in November 2012

1943 births
2015 deaths
Louisiana blues musicians
Soul-blues musicians
Songwriters from Louisiana
American male singers
American blues singers
Electric blues musicians
Musicians from Monroe, Louisiana
Singers from Louisiana
ACT Music artists
American male songwriters